Linda Jean Burney (born 25 April 1957) is an Australian politician and is an Australian Labor Party member of the Australian House of Representatives, representing Barton since the 2016 federal election. She is Minister for Indigenous Australians in the Albanese ministry, and the first woman who identifies as Aboriginal to serve in that position. 

Burney was a member of the New South Wales Legislative Assembly representing Canterbury for Labor from 2003 to 2016.  She was the New South Wales Deputy Leader of the Opposition and was also Shadow Minister for Education and Shadow Minister for Aboriginal Affairs. In the Keneally ministry, she was the Minister for the State Plan and Minister for Community Services. During 2008 and 2009, Burney was National President of the Labor Party.

Burney was the first person who identifies as Aboriginal to serve in the New South Wales Parliament in 2003, and also the first Aboriginal identifying woman to be elected to the Australian House of Representatives in 2016.

After the election of a federal Labor government in the 2022 election on 21 May 2022, Burney was appointed Minister for Indigenous Australians.

Early life and education
Burney was born on 25 April 1957 in Whitton, a small town in south-west New South Wales near Leeton, and grew up there. She is of Wiradjuri and Scottish descent. She said in her inaugural speech to NSW Parliament that she did not grow up knowing her Aboriginal family, and only met her father, Nonny Ingram, in 1984. She subsequently met ten brothers and sisters. She was raised by her elderly aunt and uncle, siblings Nina and Billy Laing, who "gave [her] the ground on which [she] stood" and taught her "the values of honesty, loyalty and respect".

Burney attended the local primary school in Whitton. She did her first four years of secondary school at Leeton High School and final two at Penrith High School.

She was one of the first Aboriginal students to graduate from the Mitchell College of Advanced Education (now known as Charles Sturt University,) where she obtained a Diploma of Teaching in 1978. She received an Honorary Doctorate in Education from Charles Sturt University in 2002.

Career in education

She began her career teaching at Lethbridge Park public school in western Sydney from 1979 to 1981, after which she worked at the Aboriginal Education Unit (Policy) of the NSW Department of Education from 1981 to 1983.

She was involved in the New South Wales Aboriginal Education Consultative Group (NSW AEGG) from the 1983 to 1998, participating in the development and implementation of the first Aboriginal education policy in Australia. She became president of AEGG in 1988.

Aboriginal Affairs

In 1998 Burney was appointed deputy director general of the Department of Aboriginal Affairs (NSW), and assumed the role of director general from 2000 to 2003.

Political career

Labor Party involvement
Burney is a member of Labor Left. In 2006 she was elected National Vice-President of the Australian Labor Party, and during 2008 and 2009 served as National President.

NSW state parliament

When Burney was elected as the Member for Canterbury in 2003, she became the first Aboriginal person to serve in the NSW Parliament. In her inaugural speech to the Legislative Assembly she said:

Burney was appointed Parliamentary Secretary for Education and Training in 2005. Following the 2007 election Burney became Minister for Fair Trading, Minister for Youth, and Minister for Volunteering. In September 2008, she was promoted to Minister for Community Services, and in December 2009 she was appointed Minister for the State Plan.

Burney's appointment as Minister for Community Services was two months prior to the handing down of the report of the Special Commission of Inquiry into Child Protection Services by retired Supreme Court Justice James Wood in November 2008. She was the lead minister in a whole of government reform plan, "Keep Them Safe", that commenced implementing the recommendations of the inquiry.

As Minister, Burney was the inaugural patron of the NSW Volunteer of the Year Award, a major NSW Government supported initiative. 

Burney held the community services and state plan portfolios until ALP's defeat at the 2011 state election. Following the election, Burney was elected as Deputy Leader of the Labor Party and Deputy Leader of the Opposition after former Deputy Premier Carmel Tebbutt chose not to stand for the position. She also became the Shadow Minister for Planning, Infrastructure and Heritage, Shadow Minister for the Central Coast and the Hunter and Shadow Minister for Sport and Recreation.

On 23 December 2014, as deputy leader, Burney became the interim leader of the opposition after the resignation of John Robertson, and was then re-elected as deputy leader to Luke Foley.

Burney was also the Shadow Minister for Education and Shadow Minister for Aboriginal Affairs until her resignation from state parliament.

Federal parliament

On 1 March 2016, Burney announced she would stand for preselection to contest the federal seat of Barton at the forthcoming 2016 federal election. She was confirmed as the Labor candidate following a vote by the ALP's national executive. She submitted her resignation to the Speaker of the NSW Legislative Assembly on 6 May 2016, and was succeeded as the state member for Canterbury by Sophie Cotsis following a by-election held on 12 November 2016.

Burney became the first Aboriginal woman to be elected to the federal House of Representatives.

Burney retained the seat of Barton for the ALP at the election, becoming the first Indigenous woman to be elected to the House of Representatives and the second Indigenous person elected to the House after Ken Wyatt in 2010. On 22 July, she was appointed Shadow Minister for Human Services.  On 28 June 2018, she added Preventing Family Violence to her portfolio responsibilities and on 22 August 2018, became Shadow Minister for Families and Social Services.

Burney was re-elected at the 2019 federal election with an increased majority. After the election she retained the families and social services portfolio in Anthony Albanese's shadow ministry and was additionally made Shadow Minister for Indigenous Australians in place of Patrick Dodson.

Since the election of a federal Labor government in the 2022 Australian election on 21 May 2022, with Anthony Albanese as prime minister of Australia, Burney was appointed Minister for Indigenous Australians, sworn in on 1 June 2022.

Senate committees

Joint Standing Committee on the National Disability Insurance Scheme, 10 September 2018 – 1 July 2019
Joint select committee on Constitutional Recognition Relating to Aboriginal and Torres Strait Islander Peoples (2018), 26 March 2018 – 29 November 2018

Other roles

Burney has held senior positions in the non-government sector, serving on a number of boards including SBS, the NSW Anti-Discrimination Board and the NSW Board of Studies. Burney was an executive member of the National Council for Aboriginal Reconciliation, President of the NSW Aboriginal Education Consultative Group and is a former Director-General of the NSW Department of Aboriginal Affairs.

In 1996, she delivered the Frank Archibald Memorial Lecture at the University of New England, on the topic of "Education and Social Justice".

In 2006, Burney gave the seventh Vincent Lingiari Memorial Lecture, and in 2008 gave the sixth Henry Parkes Oration.

As part of the 2012 Sydney Festival, Burney performed as herself delivering her inaugural speech to the NSW Parliament in a theatrical production called I am Eora.

She gave the Lowitja O'Donoghue Oration at the Don Dunstan Foundation in Adelaide on 31 May 2022, in which she spoke about the Albanese government's commitment to the Uluru Statement from the Heart.

Recognition
Burney's achievements have been recognised with the following honours and awards:
 1992: Department of School Education (NSW) Director General's Award for Outstanding Service to Public Schools
 2002: Centenary Medal
 2002: Honorary doctorate from Charles Sturt University
 2010: Meritorious Service to Public Education and Training Award
 2014: NAIDOC Lifetime Achievement Award

Personal life
Burney has a son and a daughter. Her partner for a number of years, until his death in 2006, was Rick Farley. Her son, Binni, died suddenly on 24 October 2017.

References

External links

Hon Linda Burney MP Official Australian Parliament web page
Linda Jean Burney MP – Parliament of NSW biography (archived link)
Targeted Earlier Intervention program

 

1957 births
Australian Labor Party members of the Parliament of Australia
Australian Labor Party members of the Parliament of New South Wales
Australian people of Scottish descent
Indigenous Australian politicians
Labor Left politicians
Living people
Members of the New South Wales Legislative Assembly
Members of the Australian House of Representatives
Members of the Australian House of Representatives for Barton
People from the Riverina
Wiradjuri people
Women members of the Australian House of Representatives
21st-century Australian politicians
21st-century Australian women politicians
Women members of the New South Wales Legislative Assembly
Albanese Government